is the 13th major single (17th counting the indies) by the Japanese idol group S/mileage, released in Japan on March 20, 2013.

Background 
The single will be released in four versions: Limited Edition A, Limited Edition B, Limited Edition C, Limited Edition D, and Regular Edition. The limited editions A, B, and C will include a bonus DVD with a different version of the music video for the title track. All the limited editions will be shipped sealed and will include a serial-numbered entry card for the lottery to win a ticket to one of the single's launch events. Each edition has a different cover.

There is no DVD single (containing the music video for the title song) scheduled for release this time.

Chart performance 
It is the first S/mileage single to chart at number 1 on the Oricon Daily Chart.

Track listing

Bonus 
Sealed into all the limited editions
 Event ticket lottery card with a serial number

Charts

References

External links 
 Profile on the official website of S/mileage
 
 

2013 singles
Japanese-language songs
Angerme songs
Songs written by Tsunku
Song recordings produced by Tsunku
2013 songs